Lentipes whittenorum is a species of goby endemic to marine, brackish and fresh waters of Indonesia. The specific name jointly honours the biologists Anthony (Tony) and Jane Whitten, who assisted the describer Kottelat in a number projects in Indonesia, particularly in the survey of Bali, an island on which this goby occurs.

References

whittenorum
Freshwater fish of Indonesia
Taxonomy articles created by Polbot
Fish described in 1994